Constantino Lussana (4 February 1892 – 29 September 1944) was an Italian long-distance runner who competed at the 1920 Summer Olympics.

References

External links
 

1892 births
1944 deaths
Athletes (track and field) at the 1920 Summer Olympics
Italian male long-distance runners
Olympic athletes of Italy